Petr Kašpar (born 26 June 1960) is a retired Czech football defender.

Director manager career
He began business career with traded fruit, clothing and furniture from Hungary, which were exported to the Czech Republic. Later he continued as a FK DAC 1904 Dunajská Streda club officer. Then he moved to Artmedia Petržalka as club officer. From 2010 he is a director general of ŠK Slovan Bratislava.

External links
ŠK Slovan Bratislava profile

References

1960 births
Living people
Czech footballers
Association football defenders
SK Slavia Prague players
FC DAC 1904 Dunajská Streda players
Expatriate footballers in Slovakia
Slovak Super Liga players
Újpest FC players
Expatriate footballers in Hungary
Czech expatriate sportspeople in Slovakia
Czech expatriate sportspeople in Hungary
Sportspeople from Kolín